This is a list of members of the Australian House of Representatives from 1972 to 1974. At the 2 December 1972 election, all 125 seats in the House of Representatives were up for election. The Liberal Party of Australia had been in power since 1949, under Prime Minister of Australia William McMahon since March 1971 with coalition partner the Country Party led by Doug Anthony, but were defeated by the Australian Labor Party led by Gough Whitlam.

1 Liberal member Nigel Bowen resigned on 11 July 1973; Liberal candidate Philip Ruddock won the resulting by-election on 22 September 1973.

References

Members of Australian parliaments by term
20th-century Australian politicians